STLD may refer to:
 Society of Television Lighting and Design (STLD) - formerly the Society of Television Lighting Directors.
 Sponsored top-level domain (sTLD)
 The Stock Exchange code for the company Steel Dynamics
 Star Trek: Lower Decks – a sci-fi television series